Zamalek Sporting Club is an Egyptian handball club based in Cairo. Zamalek qualified to the IHF Super Globe, the most prestigious handball club tournament of the International Handball Federation (IHF), 6 times, but withdrew 1 time (in 2018) and participated 5 times (in 2010, 2011, 2012, 2019, 2021), with these 5 participations, Zamalek is the most participating African team in the IHF Super Globe, and the 5th most participating team in the history of the tournament. As with all African clubs, the club qualifies through winning the African Handball Champions League (won a record 12 titles), or the African Handball Super Cup (won 7 titles). Zamalek had their best achievement in the IHF Super Globe when they won a bronze medal in 2010 (1st participation). In their 5 participations, Zamalek has never placed lower than 5th place (4th place twice and 5th place twice).

Summary 
Qualified to the IHF Super Globe 6 times.
Participated in the competition 5 times (2010, 2011, 2012, 2019, 2021).
Withdrew from the competition 1 time (2018); because of a diplomatic crisis between Egypt and Qatar (host).

2010 IHF Super Globe

This competition began with a groups format, and 6 teams took part, divided into two groups of three with the top two teams in each group qualifying for the semi-final.

Group stage 
Group A

Semifinal

Bronze Medal

Final ranking

Top Scorers

2011 IHF Super Globe
This competition began with a groups format, and 8 teams took part, divided into two groups of four with the top team in each group qualifying for the final.

Group stage 
Group B

Third place game

Final ranking

Top Scorers

2012 IHF Super Globe
This competition began with a groups format, and 8 teams took part, divided into two groups of four with the top two teams in each group qualifying for the semi-final.

Group stage 
Group A

Semifinals

Third place game

Final ranking

Top Scorers

2018 IHF Super Globe
Zamalek withdrew from participating in this competition after qualifying; because of a diplomatic crisis between Egypt and Qatar (host of the competition). Hammamet participated in their place.

2019 IHF Super Globe
This competition was held in a knock-out format starting from the quarterfinals qualification, and 10 teams participated in this competition, Zamalek began directly from the quarterfinals.

Quarterfinal

Placement round 5–10 
Group B

Final ranking

Top Scorers

2021 IHF Super Globe
This competition was held in a knock-out format starting from the quarterfinals qualification, and 10 teams participated in this competition, Zamalek began directly from the quarterfinals.

Quarterfinal

Placement round 5–10 
Group B

Final ranking

Top Scorers

All-Time Top Scorers

Statistics and Records 

 Zamalek scored 581 goals in the IHF Super Globe.
 3rd Most Scoring Team in the 2019 IHF Super Globe with 99 goals.
 1st Most Scoring Team in the 2021 IHF Super Globe with 112 goals.
 1st goal was scored by "Mohammed Mamdouh Hashem" against Ciudad Real.
 100th goal was scored by "Ahmed El-Ahmar" against As-Sadd.
 200th goal was scored by "Mohamed "Risha" Abd El-Salam" against Southern Stars.
 300th goal was scored by "Mohammad Sanad" against Atletico Madrid.
 400th goal was scored by "Yehia El-Deraa" against New York City THC.
 500th goal was scored by "Yehia El-Deraa" against FC Barcelona.

References

Zamalek SC
IHF Men's Super Globe